Leslie Nelson "Les" Battersby (formerly Battersby-Brown) is a fictional character of the British ITV soap opera Coronation Street, who appeared from 1997 to 2007, played by Bruce Jones. The character is best known for his outspoken opinions and his following of English rock band Status Quo.

Storylines
The Battersbys arrived when No. 5 was bought by Weatherfield Council, and a funny family was given the space. Les had at some point, spent six months in Strangeways prison for breaking and entering. He arrived with wife Janice (Vicky Entwistle), sixteen-year-old daughter Leanne (Jane Danson) (from a previous relationship with Stella Price) and fifteen-year-old step-daughter Toyah (Georgia Taylor) (from Janice's previous relationship with Ronnie Clegg). Les immediately clashed with neighbours such as: Curly Watts (Kevin Kennedy) and Des Barnes (Philip Middlemiss). He enjoyed wandering the interconnected loft spaces to look around the homes of other residents. This scared the elderly Percy Sugden (Bill Waddington) so much, that he moved away. Les' first big mistake came at the end of 1997. He bought a turkey for Christmas dinner - a live one though. After calling it Theresa, Les said he'd slit the turkey's throat. But Toyah and her vegetarian boyfriend Spider Nugent decided to liberate the turkey. When Les swore he'd find it, he took stepdaughter Toyah out for a drive in his car - but he didn't notice the turkey walk right into the path of the car. After mowing down Theresa, Les commented later on, "This is champion turkey, this!", with Leanne saying, "I can't eat this, look, it's even got tyre marks on it!"

In 1998, Les' long-lost son Greg Kelly (Stephen Billington) turned up on his doorstep. Greg was born as the result of an affair between Les and wealthy Moira Kelly, and Janice feared Les would want to hook up again with Moira. She was right, but Moira resisted Les' brand of charm and asked him to leave her home. He did, but was arrested for drink driving and banned from driving for eighteen months. Janice threw him out of the house upon learning he had slept with other women and lied to her. Les was forced to live in a camper van until he eventually won Janice round again. Greg, meanwhile, was run out of town after using Sally Webster (Sally Dynevor) for her money and then beating her. Les heard that cash was being offered for cobbles, but when he dug one up, he dropped it on his toe. He made life difficult for nurse Martin Platt (Sean Wilson) during his hospital visit, and stole drugs from the unlocked trolley. He overdosed and had to have his stomach pumped. He insisted Martin had tried to kill him, and Martin resigned when the hospital believed Les' word over his. After Janice learned that Les was planning to spend the compensation money on a holiday with Jackie Dobbs (Margi Clarke), she told the hospital board Les had taken the medication of his own accord.

Toyah began to receive English tuition from Ken Barlow (William Roache), as she wanted to become a writer. Les thought middle-aged Ken was making a move on Toyah and headbutted him. Toyah, sickened by Les and Janice, ran away to London to find who she thought was her real father Ronnie, Neil Flynn (Tim Dantay), who tied her up in his flat. Janice and Les pursued her to the big city and found her after she'd run away from Flynn. Les continued to alienate Toyah, as he beat up her boyfriend Spider and Toyah left home. Les continued to be a problem until Spider, who had begun working for the DSS, discovered Les was claiming benefits whilst working on the canal. Les was forced to leave Toyah and Spider alone. The DSS ultimately discovered Les' duplicity without Spider's help and Les was sentenced to 150 days community service scrubbing graffiti. He teased Tyrone Dobbs (Alan Halsall) for being illiterate, so Tyrone got revenge by spraying more graffiti each time Les cleaned a wall, and when Les helped out at a local park, Tyrone removed his rowing boat so that Les was marooned on an island overnight.

Janice was disgusted with Les when he drank the money she'd saved for their electricity bill, and the power was cut off. During a holiday in Wales, a young man named Owen Williams made a pass at Janice. She considered his offer, but when Les was electrocuted, she realised she couldn't cheat on him. Owen followed the family back to Weatherfield and asked Janice to join him in Wales. Les beat him up, but Janice had had enough of Les; the final straw was when he gave her a deep freezer for their anniversary.

Janice then met Les' friend Dennis Stringer, in late-2001. When 'The Chapter' threw Dennis out, Dennis came to live with the Battersbys. Janice, getting fed up of husband Les' romantic and good-tempered ways, eventually left him for Dennis. When he tried to commit suicide by gassing himself in his car on New Year's Eve, it was Dennis who came to his rescue. When Dennis tried to get Les to hospital, the car he was driving flipped over on a hill and it crashed into the field below. Dennis died in the Intensive Therapy Unit of Weatherfield General Hospital on New Year's Day 2002 whilst Les survived with minor injuries. In 2003, Janice fell in love with policeman Mick Hopwood (Ian Gain). This led to a verbal confrontation and a subsequent fight between Mick and Les, which was witnessed by Curly's ex-wife Emma; who was also a police officer. Despite the fact that Mick had initiated the violence, he and Emma committed perjury in court and got Les wrongfully jailed for six months. Janice initially applauded Mick for his "honesty", only to drop him in disgust when the truth was revealed. But despite Les' appeals, she refused to have him back too.

Les met Cilla Brown, (Wendi Peters) who was working in a pub. In no time, Cilla and her young son Chesney (Sam Aston) moved in with Les, much to Cilla's teenage daughter Fiz's (Jennie McAlpine) disappointment, and Les and Chesney got on very well. In 2004, Cilla took a six-week break and dumped Chesney on Les after a fiery row. In this time, he finally came close to winning back his true love, Janice, after she decided to cancel their divorce proceedings to reunite with Les, but Cilla came on the scene and lured him back with her larger bust and by pretending to have come into money. Janice swore never to get involved with Les again, and divorced him. At this time, Cilla dramatised an incident in which Rita Sullivan (Barbara Knox) clipped Chesney round the ear for stealing sweets from the Kabin. Rita was ordered to pay compensation of £1,000, with Cilla promising to make her pay for what she did and Cilla herself showing no mercy for Rita's age. However, Les felt bad for Rita as they had been friends for years and eventually persuaded Cilla out of her scheme for £3,000. Around the same time, whilst on a night out with Steve McDonald Les discovered his daughter, Leanne, lap-dancing in a nightclub; and brought her back to Weatherfield.

In 2005, Les dumped Chesney on the Croppers to jet off to Spain for six weeks, upon his return he expressed. They came back, but Chesney said he hated it at home and wanted to go back to the Croppers. The couple then decided to get married for the "luxurious" presents they would receive from their guests. Les’ dream came true when his favourite band, Status Quo, popped into the Rovers after a concert in the area. As he approached the band with records for them to sign, they, in turn, thumped him (as they recognised him as the lunatic who jumped on stage at a concert some twenty years previous, causing a permanent neck injury to lead singer Francis Rossi). He didn't lose his faith in the Quo though, and didn't anticipate that they would soon meet again. Cilla quickly smelt a way to make money from this and told a reluctant Les to contact his solicitor in regards to suing the band for assault. In order to avoid the bad publicity, the band were eager to settle the case with Les quickly and quietly, but Cilla's dreams of riches were quickly dashed when accepting a cash offer, settled for the band to play at the wedding reception. On her hen night, Cilla found a younger bloke on her last night of freedom, but was interrupted by a drunk Les coming home, and she passed the man off as her older son, Billy, who had turned up for the wedding. but Les was too drunk to say anything and fell asleep, while the man ran off in disgust. The real Billy turned up on the morning of her wedding day, but told Les, who was baffled upon realising that the two men were different, that perhaps he was too drunk to even remember what he looked like. Les agreed and shrugged it off, and nothing more was said. Les and Cilla finally arranged their wedding day, despite the fact that the priest was a de-frocked clergyman, and they had to distract the real vicar while they "married." Cilla smashed Tracy Barlow's (Kate Ford) window (due to the fact that she wouldn't hand over the bouquet of flowers for the ceremony because Cilla wouldn't pay up) and then ran to Dev Alahan’s (Jimmi Harkishin) shop and stole some flowers, before jumping into the wedding car heading towards the church. Les was driving when he spotted a member of Status Quo, took his eyes off the road to stare in amazement, and crashed into their van (with the other band member inside). Les put on a neck brace before "tying the knot" with Cilla, and they became known as Mr & Mrs. Battersby-Brown. The Quo turned up at a back room in the reception (where the presents were being kept) to rest. Les walked in, and told his idols that his dream was to trash a room with expensive things in. He duly wrecked everything, and threw a wedding-present TV out of the window as Cilla walked in to inform him that he had just trashed the presents. She went berserk and started attacking Les as the Quo watched in bursts of laughter, and the reception ended with the band agreeing to put past differences with Les behind, performing "Rockin’ All Over the World" with Les as a member of the band. Cilla then went on the honeymoon with her friend, Yana Lumb (Jayne Bickerton), instead of Les.

Surprisingly, it was only Les that had affairs in the marriage, the first time with his ex-wife, Janice, during a drunken one-night stand; Cilla showed Les mercy, despite giving him a hard time initially, but forgave him. The second time was when Les suspected Cilla of cheating (when she was not). Cilla's best friend, Yana Lumb took pity on Les and showed anger at an absent Cilla who didn't ever confide in her. Yana and Les eventually slept together behind the sofa in the living room, only for Cilla's son Chesney to catch them. Cilla soon found out and pretended that she had malignant cancer, leaving Les devastated and guilty and ready to do anything for his "ill" wife. Cilla got Les and Yana to get into a bathtub full of mushy peas in the cold wind out on the street, raising £600. Cilla used the money for a holiday and left Les behind. Cilla revealed that she lied about the cancer. Eventually, she, Les and Chesney began living together. After much grovelling, Cilla forgave Les and smacked Yana on the face, but also forgave her. A few days later, Les and Cilla made the marriage legal by registering at a local registry office. Les was last seen on 6 May 2007 when he was talking to Steve McDonald (Simon Gregson) and Jamie Baldwin (Rupert Hill) at the Street Cars office. Chesney had been closest to Les, and struggled to cope with his absence. Les hasn't been seen since, but had only been mentioned, and sometimes Chesney would phone him. It is that Les currently lives in Dublin due to his roadie job with the Irish tribute band, but he is referred to as being still alive and well. In 2008, Chesney received a letter from Les who has dropped the "Brown" part from his surname, which means that Les has divorced Cilla.

In 2014, his divorced ex-wife Cilla, who now lives in Wolverhampton, mentioned that she was no longer in contact with Les.

In the episode broadcast 8 January 2018, Chesney said to his fiancée Sinead Tinker that neither Les or his mother [Cilla] could make it to their wedding.

Creation and development
In 1997, new producer Brian Park wanted to bring a tougher group into what he saw as a staid programme. The Battersbys were dubbed "the family from hell", and their bitter clashes with the established characters alienated a number of longtime fans. In the Battersby Family Album special, actor Bruce Jones recounted being in a pub after the episode where Les headbutted Curly Watts, and being seriously threatened if Les ever went near Curly again.

Actor Bruce Jones was suspended from the show in March 2007, following Sunday newspaper allegations of drunkenness and inappropriate comments made in the presence of an undercover reporter.
In May, it was confirmed that he would not return, and the character of Les would be written out later in the year. His absence has so far been covered by a storyline of Les going away on tour as a roadie for Irish tribute band "ZZ Top O' The Morning".

Since his departure, Les has never been seen (although he has been spoken to by Peter Barlow on screen via a mobile phone) and has only been mentioned on a few occasions, by Fiz, Chesney, Leanne, Peter, Stella, Cilla,  Roy Cropper and most recently, Steve McDonald.

Reception
In Dorothy Catherine Anger's book "Other worlds: society seen through soap opera" she brands Les as one of the "middle aged men" who "over the years have, stymied their wives' efforts to be accepted as respectable".

References

External links
Les’s profile at www.corrie.net
The Ballad of Les Battersby sing-along pub song by Dan LaRocque

Coronation Street characters
Fictional taxi drivers
Television characters introduced in 1997
Male characters in television